Gracefield is an industrial suburb of Lower Hutt City, located at the bottom of the North Island of New Zealand.

Up until the 1980s, Gracefield and neighbouring Petone were home to woollen mills, railway workshops, car assembly and meat processing plants. But when protective tariffs were lifted in the mid-1980s, many of these industries ceased.

The headquarters and principal laboratories of Callaghan Innovation are in Gracefield, in premises developed largely from the Physics and Engineering Laboratory of DSIR.

Demographics

Gracefield had a population of 141 at the 2018 New Zealand census, an increase of 42 people (42.4%) since the 2013 census, and an increase of 66 people (88.0%) since the 2006 census. There were 66 households. There were 93 males and 45 females, giving a sex ratio of 2.07 males per female. The median age was 44.7 years (compared with 37.4 years nationally), with 18 people (12.8%) aged under 15 years, 27 (19.1%) aged 15 to 29, 84 (59.6%) aged 30 to 64, and 9 (6.4%) aged 65 or older.

Ethnicities were 85.1% European/Pākehā, 19.1% Māori, 4.3% Pacific peoples, and 2.1% other ethnicities (totals add to more than 100% since people could identify with multiple ethnicities).

The proportion of people born overseas was 14.9%, compared with 27.1% nationally.

Although some people objected to giving their religion, 78.7% had no religion, 12.8% were Christian, 2.1% were Buddhist and 2.1% had other religions.

Of those at least 15 years old, 21 (17.1%) people had a bachelor or higher degree, and 15 (12.2%) people had no formal qualifications. The median income was $37,200, compared with $31,800 nationally. The employment status of those at least 15 was that 75 (61.0%) people were employed full-time, 15 (12.2%) were part-time, and 3 (2.4%) were unemployed.

Education

References

Suburbs of Lower Hutt
Populated places in the Wellington Region